Colchicum davisii is a large-flowering plant species native to Turkey.  The flowers are very pale pink and heavily tessellated with a white throat and prominent yellow anthers.  They are produced in autumn.  The corms, are elongated and have several growing points.

References

davisii
Flora of Turkey
Garden plants
Plants described in 1998